Ha-joon is a Korean masculine given name. Its meaning depends on the hanja used to write each syllable of the name. There are 24 hanja with the reading "ha" and 34 hanja with the reading "joon" on the South Korean government's official list of hanja which may be registered for use in given names. It was the third-most popular name for newborn boys in South Korea in 2015, with 3,007 being given the name, and rose to second place in the first nine months of 2017, with 2,084 being given the name.

People with this name include:
Ha-Joon Chang (born 1963), South Korean economist
Seo Ha-joon (born Son Jong-su, 1989), South Korean actor
Wi Ha-joon (born 1991), South Korean actor
Lee Ha-joon (born 1994), member of The Rose (band)

See also
List of Korean given names

References

Korean masculine given names